Swinden is a small village in the Craven district of North Yorkshire, England. It is near Halton West and Nappa and about 7 miles north of Barnoldswick.  The population was estimated at 20 in 2010.

Swinden was historically a township in the ancient parish of Gisburn in the West Riding of Yorkshire.  It became a separate civil parish in 1866.  It was transferred to the new county of North Yorkshire in 1974.  The civil parish was abolished in 2014 and amalgamated with the parish of Hellifield.

References

External links

Villages in North Yorkshire
Former civil parishes in North Yorkshire